Francois Uys (born 12 March 1986) is a South African rugby union footballer who normally plays as a lock or flanker.

Career

He made sporadic appearances for the senior  team in Super Rugby after his debut in 2009 before finally nailing down a regular starting berth during the 2013 Super Rugby season.

In 2014, he extended his contract at the  until October 2016.

Toyota Verblitz

Uys joined Japanese Top League side Toyota Verblitz on a short-term deal during the 2015–16 Top League season.

International

Uys was a member of the South Africa Under 19 side that competed in the 2005 IRB Under 19 World Championship.

References

Living people
1986 births
South African rugby union players
Rugby union locks
Rugby union flankers
People from Springs, Gauteng
Afrikaner people
Cheetahs (rugby union) players
Free State Cheetahs players
Golden Lions players
Griffons (rugby union) players
University of Johannesburg alumni
Toyota Verblitz players
South African expatriate rugby union players
South African expatriate sportspeople in Japan
Expatriate rugby union players in Japan
Sportspeople from Gauteng